The Long Museum is a private art museum in Shanghai, China, founded by Liu Yiqian and his wife Wang Wei. The museum has two locations in Shanghai: the Long Museum Pudong and Long Museum West Bund.

In 2016, a third location was opened in Chongqing and a Wuhan branch is scheduled for 2018.

History
The Long Museum Pudong was officially opened to the public on December 18, 2012. The Long Museum West Bund opened on March 28, 2014, and was China's largest private museum at the time of its opening. It is the second of Chinese billionaire collectors Liu Yiqian and Wang Wei's. The architecture was designed by Liu Yichun of Atelier Deshaus.

See also
 West Bund
 50 Moganshan Road
 China Art Museum
 Museum of Contemporary Art Shanghai
 Shanghai Museum
 Tianzifang
 Xintiandi
 798 Art Zone

References

External links
 Official website
 Long Museum West Bund at Google Cultural Institute
 
 

Museums in Shanghai
Art museums established in 2014
Art museums and galleries in China
2014 establishments in China